Fahma is a Palestinian town in the Jenin Governorate in the Western area of the West Bank, located 15 kilometers Southwest of Jenin. According to the Palestinian Central Bureau of Statistics, the town had a population of 2,439 inhabitants in mid-year 2006.

History
Pottery sherds from early and late Roman, Byzantine, and early Islamic periods have been found here.

In 1941, a carved stone with a relief of a Torah ark was discovered near the village's mosque, which previously was a Crusader church. This finding led scholars to believe that Fahma was a Samaritan settlement during Late Antiquity, and that the church and mosque stand on the site of an earlier Samaritan synagogue.

In 1179 the village was mentioned together with Ajjah (named Casale Age)  in Crusader sources as being among the villages whose revenue were  given to the Zion Abbey by Pope Alexander III.

In the Mamluk era, it was a station on the road  between Damascus and Cairo, used for the express bringing of snow. It also had beacons for conveying messages.

Ottoman era
Fahma, like the rest of Palestine, was incorporated into the Ottoman Empire in 1517, and in the census of 1596 it was a part of the nahiya ("subdistrict") of  Jabal Sami which was under the administration of the liwa ("district") of  Nablus. The village had a population of 21 households and 2 bachelors, all Muslim. The villagers  paid a fixed tax-rate of 33,3% on agricultural products, such as  wheat, barley, summer crops, olive trees, beehives and/or goats, in addition to occasional revenues, a tax for people of liwa Nablus,  and a press for olive oil or grape syrup; a total of 6,000  akçe. Pottery sherd from the early Ottoman era have also been found here.

In 1694, Abd el-Ghani, a Muslim traveler, passed by Famah on his pilgrimage.

In 1838, Fahmeh was noted  as being in the District of  esh-Sha'rawiyeh esh-Shurkiyeh, the eastern part.

In 1882, the PEF's Survey of Western Palestine described Fahmeh as a small adobe hamlet; "on a saddle beneath the hill (Batnen Nury). It has a well and a fig garden towards the north."

British Mandate era
In the 1922 census of Palestine, conducted by the British Mandate authorities, Fahmeh had a population of 187; all Muslims, increasing in the 1931 census to 238; still all Muslims, in a total of 38 houses.

In the 1945 statistics  Fahma had a population of 350 Muslims,  and the jurisdiction of the village was 4,498 dunams of land, according to an official land and population survey.  Of this, 210 dunams were used for plantations and irrigable land, 2,173 dunams for cereals, while 14 dunams were built-up (urban) land.

Jordanian era
In the wake of the 1948 Arab–Israeli War, and after the 1949 Armistice Agreements, Fahma came under Jordanian rule.

The Jordanian census of 1961 found 541 inhabitants in Fahma.

Post 1967
Since the Six-Day War in 1967, Fahma has been under  Israeli occupation.

The village mosque is a former church, and it includes some elements (a stone door), possibly from a 3rd or 4th century Samaritan synagogue.

References

Bibliography

External links
Welcome To Fahma
Survey of Western Palestine, Map 11: IAA, Wikimedia commons

Jenin Governorate
Villages in the West Bank
Municipalities of the State of Palestine
Ancient Samaritan settlements